U.S. Naval Air Station Whiddy Island was a US naval air station operated during the last year of World War I and commissioned 4 July 1918. Located on Whiddy Island in Bantry Bay, County Cork, Ireland, it was also known as Bantry Bay Station. The base was used for anti-submarine warfare patrols by Curtiss H-16 seaplanes.

History
At the start of United States of America's involvement in the First World War five sites in Ireland; Queenstown, Wexford, Lough Foyle, Whiddy Island and Berehaven were identified to be operated by the United States Navy in support of allied operations against enemy submarines.

Operations
The Whiddy Island station was located on the eastern side of the island in Bantry Bay. Patrols and convoys for the waters to the southwest of Ireland were furnished by this station.

In all, five Curtiss Model H planes were based in Whiddy Island during 1918: BUNO *A1072, A1078, A1084, A3466, A4047, A4048. These were "pusher" type of aircraft with the engine and propeller behind the pilot.

The H-16 Large America, were equipped with four Lewis machine guns, a bomb load of four 230 pound bombs and a crew of five - a pilot, two observers, a mechanic and a wireless operator.

Accident
An aircrew crashed on 22 October 1918. Walford A. Anderson (USNRF, AE2, Springfield, MO) was killed in the crash.

End of hostilities and closure
While the base operated under wartime conditions for only seven weeks, patrols continued for some months after the armistice, and it was eventually closed on 29 January 1919.

See also
U.S. Naval Air Station Wexford Ireland 
U.S. Naval Air Station Queenstown Ireland 
U.S. Naval Air Station Lough Foyle Ireland
U.S. Naval Air Station Berehaven Ireland

References

Whiddy Island
Whiddy Island
Whiddy Island
History of County Cork
1918 establishments in Ireland
1919 disestablishments in Ireland
Military installations of the United States in Ireland
Military installations closed in 1919 
Closed installations of the United States Navy